The 1979 European Parliament election was a series of parliamentary elections held across all 9 (at the time) European Community member states. They were the first European elections to be held, allowing citizens to elect 410 MEPs to the European Parliament, and also the first international election in history.

Seats in the Parliament had been allocated to the states according to population, and in some cases were divided into constituencies, but members sat according to political groups.

Background
The Treaty of Rome which established the Communities specified that the European Parliament must be elected by universal suffrage using a common voting system. The Council of the European Union was responsible for setting up the elections but it had procrastinated. As a stop-gap measure, members were appointed to the Parliament by the member states from their own national parliaments, as they had done since the Common Assembly. The Parliament was unhappy with this and threatened to take the Council to the European Court of Justice. The Council eventually agreed to elections and the first European Parliament elections were held in 1979 after proposals were put forward in the mid 1970s. The issue of a common voting method was left undecided, and even to this day the voting methods vary from member state to member state, although all have used some form of proportional representation since 1999.

Campaigns

The campaigns varied. The former Social Democrat German Chancellor Willy Brandt took an international campaign to France, Italy, Luxembourg and the Netherlands to boost the Socialist group. On the other hand, the former Prime Minister of France Jacques Chirac used the election to gauge his popularity against the then-President of France Valéry Giscard d'Estaing, in anticipation of a presidential bid in 1981.

Election

In June, the 410 members were elected by universal suffrage. At the time there were no rules on the system of election to be used. The United Kingdom used a plurality voting system for multiple small constituencies in England, Wales and Scotland but the other member states used proportional representation for fewer larger constituencies (usually the member state itself as a single constituency), albeit with different methods of seat allocation.

The electorate took little interest but average voter turnout was 63%. The lowest turn out was in the United Kingdom with 32.2%: all others were above 50% apart from Denmark. Aside from Belgium and Luxembourg, where voting is compulsory, the highest turnout was in Italy with 84.9%.

Result
Socialist parties working together under the Europe-wide Confederation of Socialist Parties won the most seats: the resultant Socialist group had 113 MEPs. Christian Democrat parties united within the pan-European European People's Party came second, with the resultant group having 107 MEPs. The largest third force was the Conservative European Democrats with 64, followed by Communists with 44. The Liberal Democrats had 40 seats, although their candidate was elected as President.

The groups formed were loose coalitions based on the groups founded in previous years, but they soon became the basis for modern European political parties.

Result by country

Post election

Louise Weiss, who was 86 at the time, was found to be Parliament's oldest member and hence presided over the chamber while the election of the President took place (July 1979). Before that could happen however, she immediately had to deal with Ian Paisley MEP who, in the first speech of the session, protested that the British flag outside the building was flying upside down. She dealt with the interruption swiftly. The confrontation was seen as one of her finest hours and she later confided that, as a grandmother, she was used to dealing with "recalcitrant youngsters".

There were five candidates for President of the European Parliament: Giorgio Amendola, Italian Communist; Emma Bonino, Italian Technical Independent; Christian de La Malène, French Progressive Democrat; Simone Veil, French Liberal, and Mario Zagari, Italian Socialist.

In the first ballot, Veil secured 183 of the 380 votes cast – eight short of the absolute majority needed. The next closest contender was Zagari with 118 votes, then Amendola with 44, de la Malène with 26 and Bonino with 9. Bonino and de la Malène dropped out and Veil secured an absolute majority in the second ballot with 192 of the 377 votes cast (Zagari gained 128 and Amendola 47). Veil was elected as the first President of the elected Parliament, and first female President of the Parliament since it was founded in 1952.

The following were elected as Vice-Presidents: Danielle De March, Basil de Ferranti, Bruno Friedrich, Guido Gonella, Gérard Jacquet, Hans Katzer, Poul Møller, Pierre Pflimlin, Bríd Rodgers, Marcel Albert Vandewiele, Anne Vondeling and Mario Zagari.

Previously the Parliament was a weak consultative assembly, the members of which were part-time. With the elections the new body of MEPs were full-time, energetic and more diverse. As soon as the Parliament was established the "old guard" MEPs of the larger parties sought to raise the bar at which a European Parliament political group could be formed (the status gave financial support and representation in committees). This move was quickly blocked by smaller groups working together and filibustering the proposal. The ties formed at this time laid the foundations of the Rainbow group: an alliance of left-wing and green parties which later became the European Greens–European Free Alliance group.

Statistics

See also

 Members of the European Parliament 1979–1984
 History of the European Communities (1973–93)

References

External links

 The election of the Members of the European Parliament CVCE
 Full Election Details Europe Politique 
 Speech by Simone Veil during the first session CVCE

 
1979 elections in Europe
June 1979 events in Europe